Beriah Green Jr. (March 24, 1795May 4, 1874) was an American reformer, abolitionist, temperance advocate, college professor, minister, and head of the Oneida Institute. He was "consumed totally by his abolitionist views". He has been described as "cantankerous". Former student Alexander Crummell described him as a "bluff, kind-hearted man," a "master-thinker".

Early life 
Greene was born in Preston, Connecticut, son of Beriah Green (1774–1865) and Elizabeth Smith (1771–1840). His father was a cabinet and chair maker.

The family moved to Pawlet, Vermont, in 1810, and he may have attended the Pawlet Academy. In 1815 he enrolled in the Kimball Union Academy, in New Hampshire. He graduated from Middlebury College in 1819, where he was valedictorian, and then studied to become a missionary (minister) at Andover Theological Seminary (1819–20). However, his religious beliefs did not agree with any denominational creed.

Career
Because of financial need, he began teaching at Phillips Academy, also in Andover, Massachusetts. Suffering from health and vision problems, he left the seminary. After recovering, in January 1821 he married Marcia Deming of Middlebury, Vermont, and was briefly in the service of the Missionary Board in Lyme, Connecticut, and on Long Island. Having been ordained, in 1823 he became pastor of the Congregational Church in Brandon, Vermont. In 1826 his wife died, leaving him with two children, and the same year he married Daraxa Foote, also of Middlebury, who outlived Beriah. In 1829 he accepted a call to the distinctly "orthodox" (conservative) church of Kennebunk, Maine, but the next year left, to become a professor of sacred literature (Bible) in the one-man theological department of Western Reserve College and Preparatory School, in Hudson, Ohio,  from Cleveland.

The buildings of this "Yale of the West" — Green calls it that
— imitated those of Yale College. It had the same motto, "Lux et Veritas" (Light and Truth), the same entrance standards, and almost the same curriculum. It aspired to be as intellectually outstanding as Yale as well. For the time, it was well funded. It was a prestigious appointment.

The topic of slavery
In the Cleveland area (the "Connecticut Western Reserve") Beriah came in contact with more African Americans than he had in Vermont or Maine. The college first admitted an African American student in 1832, John Sykes Fayette; he graduated in 1836. Three other African-American students — Richard W. Miller, Samuel Nelson, and Samuel Harrison — were also admitted during this time period. Fugitive slaves traveling to Canada on the Underground Railroad passed through northeast Ohio: John Brown, of the 1859 raid on Harpers Ferry, grew up in Hudson (1805–1825), running a tannery, then moved to a more isolated and safer (for fugitive slaves) site in northwest Pennsylvania, a major Underground Railroad stop. That the two met is possible but undocumented; there is no known correspondence between them. What is documented is his contact with Wm. Lloyd Garrison, who through his weekly newspaper The Liberator, launched in 1831, led the fight for immediate, uncompensated liberation of all slaves. Green wrote that "One copy of Mr. Garrison's 'Thoughts' has reached us [Thoughts on African Colonization, 1832] and we take a few copies of his admirable paper." Garrison was a great influence on Green; one way was to encourage Green to publish his sermons and other writings, which gave him influence.

Sending free blacks to Africa ("colonization") was the mission of the American Colonization Society (ACS), founded by Quakers, and supported by state colonization societies and Southern slave owners. Free blacks were against it; they did not want to move to Africa, having lived for generations in the United States. They said they were no more African than the white Americans were British.

The debate started by Garrison's newspapers and book led to a heated campus debate. "Trustees, faculty, and students began to choose sides." College president Charles Backus Storrs had been a supporter of colonization as a solution to "the negro problem". But he read William Lloyd Garrison's new abolitionist newspaper The Liberator and said that Garrison's views could not be refuted. His inaugural address, in February, 1831, invoked the abolitionism of William Wilberforce.

The influential Theodore Weld made a visit to Western Reserve in the fall of 1832. "Less than two months aftef Weld departed, Green was preaching abolitionism from the college pulpit." Green used the college chapel four Sundays in a row to attack the American Colonization Society and its supporters. This angered many trustees and clergymen.

The four sermons on slavery
Green's four sermons on slavery, delivered in November and December, 1832, constitute a turning point of national significance.

One of the duties, or honors, of his job was delivering the weekly sermon from the pulpit of the college chapel:

As fellow professor Elizur Wright wrote, Green was "pastor of our college church".

In his sermons, Green took the position, unusual in his day, that negroes were the equals of whites, and the victims of irrational prejudice based on no more than the color of their skin. These sermons created "a rumpus" on the campus. Some people walked out of the first sermon, and they and more refused to hear the following sermons.

Green, who frequently published pamphlets, had the four sermons published. In the pamphlet was a brief message from College President Storrs and Elizur Wright, another professor, certifying that the published texts were the same as those delivered in the College chapel, and that "the sentiments embodied on these discourses, we believe to be scriptural. The  exhibition of them in the college-chapel...we believe to have been not only warranted, but imperiously demanded, by a just regard to pastoral fidelity."

They were influential nationally, contributing to the foundation, the following year, of the American Anti-Slavery Society. Green presided over its founding meeting, and was chosen as its first President.

The Oneida Institute
Expecting to be fired, Green resigned in 1833 and became the President of the Oneida Institute, a Presbyterian institution in Whitesboro, New York. Green accepted the presidency at Oneida on two conditions: that he be allowed to preach immediatism (the immediate abolition of slavery), and that he be allowed to accept African-American students.

As President, Green dramatically changed the college by accepting numerous African Americans, more than any other college during the 1830s and 1840s. Green did not believe that it was right to have separate schools for blacks and whites. This belief led him to attempt to get Gerrit Smith to merge his unsuccessful black manual labor school in Peterboro with the Oneida Institute, and it made Oneida a hotspot for abolitionist activity. Many future black leaders and abolitionists were students at Oneida while Green was president. These include William Forten, Alexander Crummell, Rev. Henry Highland Garnet, William G. Allen, Jermain Wesley Loguen, and Rev. Amos Noë Freeman.

In 1832, Green began to correspond with Gerrit Smith on the issue of black education. The two men became very close friends and much of what is known about Green is known from their letters. The two men worked together toward the goal of abolition. They continued correspondence until 1872, when they stopped writing because of long-held disagreements about civil government and political abolition.

Green was the first president of the American Anti-Slavery Society, formed in 1833 in Philadelphia. He was famous for refuting the arguments of men who used the Bible to defend slavery.  In the late 1830s, Green focused most of his time contesting these arguments.

In 1835, Green and his friend Alvan Stewart convinced Gerrit Smith to come to an organizational meeting for a New York Anti-Slavery Society, which they had called, in Utica. An anti-abolitionist mob, including Congressman Samuel Beardsley and other "principal citizens", "reviled the participants" and forced the convention to adjourn. At Smith's invitation they continued their meeting in his home town, nearby Peterboro, New York.

Decline and closure of the Oneida Institute
The Panic of 1837 hit the Oneida Institute hard — its benefactors the Tappan brothers were ruined and unable to fulfill their pledges — and the college began to decline. Green also had begun to lose favor with conservative Presbyterians, which added to Oneida's troubles. Green led the secession of 59 church members from the Presbyterian church in Whitesboro over the issue of abolition. The seceders formed the Congregational Church in Whitesboro in 1837. Green was pastor of that church from 1843 to 1867.

In 1844, the Oneida Institute was sold to the Free Will Baptists because of financial problems. After the Oneida Institute closed, Green became an active supporter of the Liberty Party. This was a third party that was completely devoted to the abolition of slavery. After the party failed to make an impact on American politics, Green became bitter with the democratic process. He did not like popular democracy and was in favor of an oligarchy or modified theocracy.  Unlike many Liberty Party members, Green did not join the Free Soil Party.  He was worried that abolition would not be part of the major party principles.

After fellow abolitionists did not support his ideas about government, Green became resentful and did not travel far from Whitesboro. He supported his wife and children by farming and preaching to small groups of abolitionists.

He died on May 4, 1874 while giving a speech on temperance in Whitesboro.

Judgments about Green
His student William E. Allen said Green "is a profound scholar, an original thinker, and, better and greater than all these, a sincere and devoted Christian. To the strength and vigor of a man, he adds the gentleness and tenderness of a woman."

Charles Stuart, another contemporary, seeking to raise funds for the Institute: "The labors of President Green in the antislavery cause, in the way of lectures, and the use of the press, have been various, indefatiguable, abundant, in the face of evils and proscriptions of various kinds, and eminently successful. He has all alone shone himself a man for emergencies. On such occasions, whoever else may have done it, Beriah Green has never been known to flee or flinch. The result is that the Institute has always been in the midst of a hard struggle — in establishing and sustaining itself as a manual labor college, second in defense of its course of study, and last, not least, in its vindication and defense of the rights of humanity.

According to William Sernett, author of the only book on Green, "Green's erratic personality, acerbic tongue, and lack of political acumen were just as responsible for the closing of the institute as were problems with conservative trustees and the withdrawal of financial support from several key funding sources." "Although known during his lifetime as a 'fanatic' by many, Green has been more aptly described as a 'radical humanitarian'. Indeed, his life was a testimony to his beliefs. In the final analysis, he forfeited wealth, reputation, friends, and ultimately respectability for 'the cause'."

Writings
 Books
 According to Appletons' Cyclopædia of American Biography, Green published in Albany, 1823, a History of the Quakers. No other information has been found about this book.
 
 
 Sermons and essays
 
 
 
 
 
 
 
 
 
 

 
 
 
 
 
 
 
 Published letters
 Letter to Theodore Weld, October 1832
 Letter to Simeon Jocelyn, November 5, 1832

References

Further reading (most recent first)
 
 

1795 births
1874 deaths
People from Preston, Connecticut
American theologians
19th-century American historians
19th-century American male writers
Middlebury College alumni
American temperance activists
Oneida Institute
People from Hudson, Ohio
Western Reserve College and Preparatory School faculty
American Congregationalist ministers
People from Whitesboro, New York
People from Pawlet, Vermont
People from Brandon, Vermont
People from Kennebunk, Maine
Underground Railroad people
Congregationalist abolitionists
Underground Railroad in New York (state)
19th-century American clergy
American male non-fiction writers
Historians from New York (state)
Historians from Ohio
Historians from Connecticut